The Dictionnaire de l'Académie française is the official dictionary of the French language.

The Académie française is France's official authority on the usages, vocabulary, and grammar of the French language, although its recommendations carry no legal power. Sometimes, even governmental authorities disregard the Académie's rulings.  the eighth edition of 1935 is the latest complete edition, with the ninth edition in progress, available online up to Sérénissime.

Publication
A special Commission (Commission du dictionnaire) composed of several (but not all) of the members of the Académie undertakes the compilation of the dictionary. It has published thirteen editions of the dictionary, of which three were preliminary, eight were complete, and two were supplements for specialised words.  The completed edition of the Dictionnaire de l'Académie française, the first official dictionary of the French language, was presented upon completion by the Académie to King Louis XIV.    on 24 August 1694.  

Preliminary editions:
 Le Dictionnaire de l'Académie françoise (from A to Aversion), pre-edition, Frankfurt am Main, 1687
 Le Dictionnaire de l'Académie françoise (from A to Confiture), pre-edition, Frankfurt am Main, 1687
 Le Dictionnaire de l'Académie françoise (from A to Neuf), pre-edition, Paris, 1687

Complete editions:
  (1st edition), Paris, 1694
 Nouveau Dictionnaire de l'Académie françoise dedié au Roy (2nd edition), Paris, 1718
 Le Dictionnaire de l'Académie françoise (3rd edition), Paris, 1740
 Le Dictionnaire de l'Académie françoise (4th edition), Paris, 1762
 Le Dictionnaire de l'Académie françoise (5th edition), Paris, 1798
 Dictionnaire de l'Académie française (6th edition), Paris, 1835
 Dictionnaire de l'Académie française (7th edition), Paris, 1879
 Dictionnaire de l'Académie française (8th edition), Paris, 1932–1935

Supplementary editions for the sciences, arts, and technology:
 Corneille, Thomas, Le Dictionnaire des Arts et des Sciences, Paris, 1694
 Barré, Louis, Complément du Dictionnaire de l'Académie française, Paris, 1842
 
In 1778, the Académie attempted to compile a "historical dictionary" of the French language. The project was later abandoned, having failed to progress beyond the letter "A".

The 8th edition of 1935 contained approximately 35,000 words. The Académie continues work on the ninth edition, begun in 1986, of which the first volume (A to Enzyme) was published in 1992, the second (Éocène to Mappemonde) in 2000, and the third (Maquereau to Quotité) in 2011. As the work goes on, additional parts of the Dictionnaire are published in the Documents administratifs of the Journal Officiel, and posted online. The finalised ninth edition is expected to contain about 28,000 new words (60,000 in total). In part because the current edition dates from 1935, other dictionaries (such as those published by Larousse and Le Robert) are more commonly used as everyday reference sources than that of the Académie.

Encoding
The IETF language tags have registered  for Early Modern French, "17th century French, as catalogued in the "Dictionnaire de   l'académie françoise", 4eme ed. 1694; frequently includes   elements of Middle French, as this is a transitional period".

See also

 Language policy in France
 Reforms of French orthography

References

External links

Searchable original texts
 University of Chicago, The ARTFL Project, Dictionnaires d'autrefois, Full text, searchable French dictionaries of the 17th, 18th, 19th and 20th centuries. Includes: Dictionnaire de L'Académie française: 1st (1694), 4th (1762), 5th (1798), 6th (1835), and 8th (1932–5) editions; Jean Nicot's Thresor de la langue française (1606), Jean-François Féraud's Dictionaire critique de la langue française (1787–1788), and Émile Littré's Dictionnaire de la langue française (1872–1877)
 Académie française, Dictionnaire de l'Académie française, 4th edition online, official site
 Académie française, Dictionnaire de l'Académie française, 8th edition online, official site
 Académie française, Dictionnaire de l'Académie française, 9th edition online, official site, work-in-progress with regular updates

Facsimile reproductions
Source: Bibliothèque nationale de France:
 Le Dictionnaire de l'Académie françoise dedié au Roy, 1st edition (1694), vol. 1, vol. 2 
 Nouveau Dictionnaire de l'Académie françoise dedié au Roy, 2nd edition (1718), vol.
 Le Dictionnaire de l'Académie françoise, 3rd edition (1740), vol. 1, vol .2
 Le Dictionnaire de l'Académie françoise, 4th edition (1762), vol. 1, vol. 2
 Le Dictionnaire de l'Académie françoise, 5th edition (1798), vol. 1, vol. 2
 Dictionnaire de L'Académie française, 6th edition (1835), vol. 1, vol. 2
 Dictionnaire de L'Académie française, 7th edition (1878), vol. 1, vol. 2

Académie française
1687 books
1694 books
1718 books
1740 books
1762 books
1798 non-fiction books
1835 non-fiction books
1879 non-fiction books
17th-century French literature
18th-century French literature
19th-century French literature
Académie Française